Golden Gate Highlands National Park is located in Free State, South Africa, near the Lesotho border. The park's most notable features are its golden, ochre, and orange-hued, deeply eroded sandstone cliffs and outcrops, especially the Brandwag rock. Another feature of the area is the numerous caves and shelters displaying San rock paintings. Wildlife featured at the park includes mongooses, eland, zebras, and over 100 bird species. It is the Free State's only national park, and is more famous for the beauty of its landscape than for its wildlife. Numerous paleontology finds have been made in the park, including dinosaur eggs and skeletons.

Geography and climate

"Golden Gate" refers to the sandstone cliffs found on either side of the valley at the Golden Gate dam. In 1875, a farmer called J.N.R. van Reenen and his wife stopped here as they travelled to their new farm in Vuurland. He named the location "Golden Gate" when he saw the last rays of the setting sun fall on the cliffs.

In 1963,  were proclaimed as a national park, specifically to preserve the scenic beauty of the area. In 2004,  the park was announced to be joining with the neighbouring QwaQwa National Park.

The park is situated in the Rooiberge of the eastern Free State, in the foothills of the Maluti Mountains. The Caledon River forms the southern boundary of the park, as well as the border between the Free State and Lesotho.

The park is located in the eastern highveld region of South Africa, and experiences a dry, sunny climate from June to August. It has showers, hail, and thunderstorms between October and April. It has thick snowfalls in the winter.

Vegetation
The park is an area of rich highveld and montane grassland flora. It has more than 60 grass species and a large variety of bulbs and herbs. Each of these species has its own flowering time, meaning that veld flowers can be seen throughout the summer. The park also has Afromontane forests and high-altitude Austro-Afro alpine grassland, which is scarce in South Africa. The ouhout (Leucosidea sericea), an evergreen species, is the most common tree in the park. Ouhout is a favourite habitat of beetles and 117 species occur on these trees in the park. The Lombardi poplars and weeping willows in the park are introduced species, but are kept because of their cultural and historic connection with the eastern Free State. Other exotic species in the park, for example wattle and bluegum, are systematically eradicated.

Wildlife
Instead of reintroducing one of the "big five" into the park, the sungazer lizard and water mongoose were reintroduced. Twelve species of mice, 10 species of carnivores, and 10 antelope species have been recorded in the park. The grey rhebuck and the mountain reedbuck were present when the park was established.

Mammals

Birds
Over 210 bird species have been observed in the park, including the rare bearded vulture and the endangered Cape vulture and bald ibis.

Snakes and fishes
Seven snake species, including the puff adder, mountain adder, and rinkhals, are found in the park.

Geology and palaeontology
The geology of the park provides very visual "textbook" examples of Southern Africa's geological history. The sandstone formations in the park form the upper part of the Karoo Supergroup. These formations were deposited during a period of aeolian deposition towards the end of the Triassic Period. At the time of deposition, the climate of the area the park covers was becoming progressively drier until arid desert conditions set in, resulting in a land of dunes and sandy desert, with occasional scattered oases. The deposition of the sandstones ended when lava flowed out over the desert 190 million years ago.

The following sequence of geological formations is visible in the park (starting from the bottom): the Molteno Formation, Elliott Formation, Clarens Formation, and Drakensberg Formation. The yellow-brown Golden Gate and Brandwag cliffs are made up of the Clarens formation. The Drakensberg formation comprises the basaltic lava that flowed over the desert. It forms the mountain summits in the park. The Elliot Formation is a red mudstone where many dinosaur fossils have been found.

The oldest dinosaur embryos ever discovered were found in the park in 1978. The eggs were from the Triassic Period (220 to 195 million years ago) and had fossilised foetal skeletons of Massospondylus, a prosauropod dinosaur. More examples of these eggs have since been found in the park. Other fossils found in the park include those of advanced cynodontia (canine toothed animals), small thecodontia (animals with teeth set firmly in the jaw), and bird-like and crocodile-like dinosaurs.

Accommodation 
Accommodation in the park is available at Glen Reenen and Brandwag Rest camps. Caravan and camp sites with all amenities are available at Glen Reenen camp. The hotel was formerly part of Brandwag camp, but since its recent refurbishment, it is managed separately by SANParks as Golden Gate Hotel. The nearest town to Golden Gate Highlands National Park is Clarens (17 km to the west), but Phuthaditjhaba is also easily reached by a good tar road, driving through the access gate to the east of the park.

Notes 
This park will be included into the Maloti-Drakensberg Transfrontier Conservation Area, Peace Park.

See also 
 QwaQwa National Park (incorporated into Golden Gate Park as the QwaQwa homeland no longer exists).

References

External links

 South Africa National Parks Official site.

IUCN Category II
Protected areas established in 1963
National parks of South Africa
Protected areas of the Free State (province)